The Italian Catholic Diocese of Prato in Tuscany, has existed since 1954. Its see is Prato Cathedral. The diocese is a suffragan of the Archdiocese of Florence.

History

The diocese was created when the Diocese of Pistoia-Prato was split by Pope Pius XII in 1954.

Bishops
Pietro Fiordelli (7 July 1954  – 1991) 
Gastone Simoni (1991 – 2012)
Franco Agostinelli (2012 – 15 May 2019)
Giovanni Nerbini (15 May 2019 – present)

Churches
Santa Maria Assunta in Filettole

References

External links
Catholic Hierarchy page 

Prato
Christian organizations established in 1954
Prato